Michael J. Gaines (born March 30, 1980 in Tallahassee, Florida) is a former American football tight end. He was drafted by the Carolina Panthers in the seventh round of the 2004 NFL Draft. He played college football at UCF.

Gaines has also played for the Buffalo Bills, Detroit Lions, Chicago Bears and Cleveland Browns.

Early years
Gaines attended Florida High School which is a developmental school associated with Florida State University
As a football standout, he played six different positions, including backup quarterback and finished his high school career with 56 receptions, 1,715 receiving yards and 20 touchdowns. He earned first-team all-state recognition as a junior and senior and registered 20 receptions for 535 yards and nine touchdowns in addition to collecting 110 tackles on defense as a senior. Gaines was rated the number one tight end in Florida. He was the first player from his school to participate in the Florida-Georgia High School All-Star Game.

College career
Gaines played in 23 games with four starts for the University of Central Florida. He recorded 22 receptions for 306 yards and three touchdowns. In 2003, he was selected to play in the Blue-Gray Game.

During Gaines Junior season at UCF, he had a stellar breakout game against Toledo, (Ohio).  During the game, Gaines caught what was to have been a short yard gain for a first down, but he displayed balance and athleticism that caught the eye of NFL scouts.  Gaines proved to be virtually unstoppable against the Toledo defense.

Professional career
At 6'4 and close to 280 pounds, Gaines has the reputation of a blocking tight end, often lining up in double tight end or goal line formations.  Through the 2007 NFL season, Gaines has started 35 of the 57 games he has played in.  In 2007 with the Bills, Gaines set career highs in receptions (25) and reception yardage (215).  He tied a career-high with 2 touchdown receptions.

Carolina Panthers
One of four rookie draft choices to start a game for Carolina in 2004, along with Keary Colbert, Chris Gamble, and Travelle Wharton.

Buffalo Bills
On September 10, 2007 he signed with the Buffalo Bills. His first touchdown catch as a Buffalo Bill came on October 28 on a fourth and goal situation.

Detroit Lions
Michael Gaines DE On March 3, 2008, he signed with the Detroit Lions. He was released on April 29, 2009.

Chicago Bears
Gaines signed a 1-year deal with the Chicago Bears on May 11, 2009. He was released on October 17 after the Bears acquired Gaines Adams from the Tampa Bay Buccaneers.

Cleveland Browns
Gaines signed with the Cleveland Browns on October 21, 2009.

Houston Texans
Gaines signed with the Houston Texans on April 23, 2010, but was released in the preseason.

References

External links
Detroit Lions bio

1980 births
Living people
Players of American football from Florida
American football tight ends
UCF Knights football players
Carolina Panthers players
Buffalo Bills players
Detroit Lions players
Chicago Bears players
Cleveland Browns players
Houston Texans players